Eddie Hui Ki-on, GBS, CBE, QPM, CPM (10 October 1943 - 3 May 2009) was the last Commissioner of the Royal Hong Kong Police from 1994–1997, and the first Commissioner of Hong Kong Police from 1 July 1997 to 1 January 2001. Li Kwan-ha ran the force before him. Hui was the second ethnic Chinese person to lead the force.

Career 
In February 1963, at 19 years old, Hui's police career began when he joined the Hong Kong Police Force as a probationary inspector. By 1966 Hui became an inspector.
By July 1972, Hui became the superintendent of Hong Kong Police Force. By June 1982, Hui was promoted to chief superintendent of Hong Kong Police Force.

Hui became senior assistant commissioner in 1989 and deputy commissioner (operations) in 1993. He later became a member of the board of directors of the Hong Kong Stock Exchange and Clearings Ltd.

In 1997's preparation for Hong Kong's handover to China on 1 July 1997, the Chinese officials will retain Hui as the police commissioner to maintain peace in the ranks in Hong Kong after July 1997.

Organizations
Eddie Hui was on the main board for many organizations. These include being the vice president of the Hong Kong Football Association, the executive director for K Wah International Holdings Ltd and an independent non-executive director for RoadShow Holdings Ltd. Similar to many in his father's family, Eddie Hui was a voting member of the prestigious Hong Kong Jockey Club.

Awards
Hui received the honors of the Commander of the Order of the British Empire (CBE) and the Gold Bauhinia Star.In addition, Hui was awarded the Colonial Police Medal in 1979 Birthday Honours and Queen's Police Medal in 1988 New Year Honours.

Personal life 
Hui had a wife and two sons. In 2008, Hui was diagnosed with cancer. On 3 May 2009, Hui died from liver cancer in Queen Mary Hospital in Hong Kong at the age of 65.

References

External links 
 Offbeat - Eddie Hui Ki-on
 Offbeat - Commissioned to serve
 SCMP.com articles

Deaths from cancer in Hong Kong
Hong Kong Police Force
Hong Kong Police commissioners
Government officials of Hong Kong
People from Panyu District
Alumni of King's College, Hong Kong
Commanders of the Order of the British Empire
Recipients of the Gold Bauhinia Star
Hong Kong recipients of the Queen's Police Medal
Recipients of the Colonial Police Medal
1943 births
2009 deaths